Mandeep Roy (4 April 1949 – 29 January 2023) was an Indian actor in the Kannada film industry. Some of his films as an actor included ...Re (2016), Aaptha Rakshaka (2010), Amrithadhare (2005), Kurigalu Saar Kurigalu (2001).

Life and career
Mandeep Roy appeared in more than 500 films in Kannada cinema.

Roy died from a cardiac arrest on 29 January 2023, at the age of 73.

Filmography

 Minchina Ota (1980)
 Devara Aata (1981)
 Baadada Hoo (1982)
 Benkiya Bale (1983)
 Makkaliralavva Mane Thumba (1984)
 Bidugadeya Bedi (1985)
 Nannavaru (1986)
 Anthima Ghatta (1987)
 Elu Suttina Kote (1988)
 Gajapathi Garvabhanga (1989)
 Aasegobba Meesegobba (1990)
 Bhairavi (1991)
 Agni Panjara (1992)
 Aathanka (1993)
 Aakasmika (1993)...Srikanth
 Apoorva Samsara (1994)
 Bal Nan Maga (1995)
 Aayudha (1996)
 Agni IPS (1997)
 Arjun Abhimanyu (1998)
 King (1998)
 Chandramukhi Pranasakhi (1999)
 Deepavali (2000)
 Aunty Preethse (2001)
 Nagarahavu (2002)
 Aathma (2002)
 Preethsod Thappa (2003)
 Kushee (2003)
 Avale Nanna Gelathi (2004)
 Ayya (2005)
 Hatavadi (2006)
 Sixer (2007)
 Beladingalagi Baa (2008)
 Taxi No-1 (2009)
 Aptharakshaka (2010)
 Rangappa Hogbitna (2011)
 Alemari (2012)
 Paraari (2013)
 Amanusha (2014)
 Ond Chance Kodi (2015)
 Maduveya Mamatheya Kareyole (2016)
 Pushpaka Vimana (2017)
 Raajakumara (2017)
 Auto Ramanna (2021)

See also

List of people from Karnatakaq
List of Indian film actors
Cinema of India

References

External links
 
 Biography of Mandeep Roy on Bookmyshow.com

1949 births
2023 deaths
20th-century Indian male actors
21st-century Indian male actors
Indian male film actors
Male actors from Karnataka
Male actors in Kannada cinema